Khlong Sam Wa is one of the 50 districts (khet) of Bangkok, Thailand. It is bounded by other districts (from north clockwise): Lam Luk Ka district of Pathum Thani province, Nong Chok, Min Buri, Khan Na Yao, Bang Khen, and Sai Mai of Bangkok.

History
Khlong Sam Wa was established as a district on 21 November 1997 by splitting from Min Buri. Khlong Sam Wa was the name of an amphoe (district) in Min Buri and hence the name is used as the district name. In 1947 when the area was still rural, the farming community of Bang Chan was chosen as a centre for Thai studies.

Its name "Khlong Sam Wa" literally translates as a khlong (canal) with a width of three wa (5.943 m).

Administration
The district is divided into five sub-districts (khwaeng).

District council
The district council for Khlong Sam Wa has seven members, who each serve four-year terms. Elections were last held on 30 April 2006. The Thai Rak Thai Party won seven seats.

Places

 Safari World
Wari Phirom Park
Wat Phraya Suren and Wat Phraya Suren Floating Market

Kip Mu
Kip Mu (กีบหมู, "pig's hoof") is a neighbourhood in Bang Chan sub-district that is widely known as "labour market", owing it is a gathering place for day labours. Every morning, from about 5.00 a.m. until no later than 9.00 a.m., there are employers and contractors drive pickup trucks to hire workmen here. Which are available in a variety of options according to individual aptitudes, such as carpenter, painter, plumber, welder, plasterer or unskilled labour.

References

External links
 BMA website with Khlong Sam Wa landmarks

 
Districts of Bangkok